Jaweplu Chai is an Indian female judge currently posted in Arunachal Pradesh, in the northeastern part of the country. In 2013, Chai became the first woman judge of her state. She was posted as an additional district and sessions’ judge at Basar in West Siang district.

In the process, Chai also became the first lawyer in her community called Mishmi which has a population around 30,000 in the hilly state bordering China. In April 2013, she topped the Arunachal Pradesh Judicial Service.

Chai studied at TCM Government Upper Primary School and at Government HS School, Tezu before moving to Shillong in Meghalaya for Bachelor of Degree and law course.

References 

21st-century Indian judges
Year of birth missing (living people)
Living people
Women educators from Arunachal Pradesh
Educators from Arunachal Pradesh
21st-century Indian women judges